William Massey Stroud Doyle (1769-1828) was a portrait painter and museum proprietor in Boston, Massachusetts.

Portraits
He oversaw the Columbian Museum on Tremont Street in the early 19th century.

As an artist, Doyle created portraits of:

 John Adams
 Elijah Bigelow
 Jean-Louis Lefebvre de Cheverus
 Anna Brewster Cleland, 1822
 Thomas Ivers Cleland, 1815
 Elijah Corey
 Lydia Gendell Dawes
 Nicolas Michel Faucon
 Samuel Foster
 Gottlieb Graupner, 1807
 Clarendon Harris
 John Hicks, 1806
 Benjamin Hurd, Jr.
 John Jones, c. 1815
 John May
 James Melledge, 1811
 William Porter
 Samuel Stockwell and Catherine Stockwell
 Caleb Strong
 James Sullivan
 Isaiah Thomas, 1805
 Rufus Webb

According to historian Charlotte Moore, Doyle's daughter, Margaret Byron Doyle, "also worked as an artist."

Gallery

See also
 Columbian Museum, Boston (1795–1825)

References

Further reading 
 Alice Van Leer Carrick. Shades of our ancestors: American profiles and profilists. Boston: Little, Brown, and Company, 1928. Google books
 Arthur Kern and Sybil Kern. The pastel portraits of William M.S. Doyle. The Clarion (American Folk Art Museum), 1988; p. 41-47
 C. Moore. "William Massey Stroud Doyle." In: Gerard C. Wertkin, ed. Encyclopedia of American folk art. Taylor & Francis, 2004; p. 139.

External links

 Bostonian Society owns a "pastel self-portrait on paper of Doyle," April 22, 1828.
 Historic New England owns works by Doyle.

American portrait painters
1769 births
1828 deaths
Artists from Boston
19th century in Boston
Cultural history of Boston
Silhouettists